Ilanga aquamarina is a species of sea snail, a marine gastropod mollusk in the family Solariellidae.

Description
The shell has a depressed conical shape and is deeply umbilicate. It contains six whorls. The three apical whorls are small and thin. The aperture is round. The horny operculum has 6-7 spirals. The shell has a slightly fugitive colour of pearly aquamarine or beryl. It is remarkably smooth, the only sculpture being the incised radiate sulculi around the umbilicus, and the fine spiral liration of the apical whorls. The simple peristome is remarkably thin and not in the least reflected. This species has all the appearance of an abysmal shell.

Distribution
This marine species occurs off Saya de Malha Bank, West Indian Ocean

References

External links
 To World Register of Marine Species

aquamarina
Gastropods described in 1909